Wesley College is an independent co-educational secondary school for day and boarding students in Ballinteer, Dublin, Ireland. Wesley College is under the control of a Board of Governors, appointed each year by the Methodist Church in Ireland.

Wesley College was founded on 1 October 1845 and counts two Nobel laureates among its alumni. Strong emphasis is put on religious education for all denominations and both extra-curricular activities and sport play an important part in this school. The college offers pupils an opportunity to explore the humanities, sciences, technology, business studies, English literature, music and the arts. Wesley College offers a range of extracurricular and sporting activities in the belief that these assist a "sound general education and contribute to the whole person".

History

Origins
On 16 May 1844, a gathering of men met in Belfast and agreed to form a Wesleyan Proprietary Grammar School in Ireland "for the purpose of affording a thorough literary, scientific and commercial education, with a sound, religious, and moral training, in strict accordance with the principles of Wesleyan Methodism".

The committee originally proposed a boarding and day school for boys, in the vicinity of Belfast but later decided that the Wesleyan Connexional School should be established in Dublin which was the hub of Ireland's transport system and had a far greater population. A large dilapidated dwelling house, No. 79 St. Stephen's Green, sited on what is now part of the Department of Foreign Affairs, was leased from the trustees of The King's Hospital.

The Wesleyan Connexional School was founded in 1845 in St. Stephen's Green, Dublin by a group of Methodist Ministers and other men for the Methodist Community in Ireland.  In 1879 the Methodist Conference granted the request of the School's Trustees that it would be named Wesley College.

Development

In June 1911 the Wesley College Trustees put the following proposal to the Methodist Conference, "This committee, having had the fact brought under their notice that at the present time there is no school in the three southern provinces under the Methodist Management offering to girls the advantages of an Intermediate education, suggests to the Conference that the present is a suitable occasion for opening Wesley College to girls who desire to secure such training as will fit them for professional and business careers". The Conference responded favourably and the Trustees purchased No. 110 St. Stephen's Green as a girls' hostel. It had formerly been known as "The Epworth Club", a boarding house for young Epworth business men coming to Dublin, which had ceased to serve its purposes. The hostel was called Epworth House.

Six boarder girls and fifteen day-girls, together with the new boys, joined the 175 (approximately) boys already in the college in September 1911.

Right up to the 1940s co-education was narrowly interpreted and strictly supervised. The boys were always called by their surnames, while the girls had their surnames prefixed by "Miss". Casual conversation between the boys and girls was discouraged and they did not have meals together until the 1950s.

Move to Ballinteer

In 1969 Wesley College sold its buildings at Appian Way in Dublin to Fitzwilliam Lawn Tennis Club and its other buildings at Burlington Road and Leeson Street Upper to property developers to form the site on which was later to be constructed the Burlington Hotel. The school then moved to its present  site in Ballinteer, a suburb of Dublin, at the foothills of the Dublin mountains. The final school activity on the old College site was the end-of-year service in the Large Schoolroom on 14 June 1969, followed by a celebration of Holy Communion in the chapel. The official opening and dedication of the new buildings at Ludford Park took place at 3.00 p.m. on Saturday, 7 June 1969, opened by Éamon de Valera, President of Ireland.

The 1969 campus was added to in 1980, 1987, and 1991, a state of the art library and Information Technology building was added in 1999 and a new modern music and arts centre as well as a Materials Technology suite were opened in 2005. In 2019 a state of the art sports centre was opened.

School coat of arms

In 1969, the college obtained from the Chief Herald an official grant of arms, which replaced that previously used. The upper part of the shield has a red ground, and bears the Bible, surmounted by a Maltese cross, an old Wesley College symbol. To the right is an escallop shell from the arms of John Wesley's family. The lower part of the shield has a blue ground and on it a flaming castle from the Dublin City arms. The scroll below the shield contains the college motto in Greek, "Prove all things; hold fast that which is good." (I Thessalonians 5.21)

Extracurricular activities
Extracurricular activities include drama, debating (where speakers have recently achieved international honours), Amnesty International, Christian Union, and many others.

In 2010 Carin Hunt, a fifth year, travelled to Qatar as part of the Irish debating team for the World's Debating. Former student Mark Haughton was the Irish Team's debating coach, and had achieved second as part of the Irish team, in the World's Debating while at Wesley. Carin went on to captain the team in the School's finals in Dundee the following year, taking them to the semi-finals.

Wesley has won the All Ireland hockey trophy. Wesley not only places an emphasis on activities which solely help students themselves but also to move children is highly important for the teaching staff. Students in Transition year are able to reach out in various ways such as classroom assistance, helping children with special needs and music teaching. In recent years a team from Wesley's Transition year has embarked on a Habitat for Humanity house building trip annually.

The students of the college also produce a monthly newspaper, Full Stop which has been providing a voice for students since 9 December 2003.

Rugby
From the beginning, Rugby Union has been the main competitive team sport for boys in the school. The school won the Leinster Schools Rugby Senior Cup in 1898 and the Senior league final in 2000. The Senior Cup team have played in the Vincent Murray Cup final on five occasions; winning in 2002, 2013, 2015 and 2018 and losing the final in 2009. In 2018 the school won their first junior trophy beating Kilkenny College the Fr Godfrey final.

Wesley has produced a number of provincial and international rugby players including Josh van der Flier and Eric Miller .

Rugby Honours
 Leinster Schools Rugby Senior Cup - 1898
 Leinster Schools Rugby Senior League - 2000
 Leinster Schools Vinnie Murray Cup - 2002, 2013, 2015, 2018 (Runners Up: 2009)
 Leinster Schools Fr Godrey Cup - 2018

Interschools Music Festival

Each year Wesley hosts one of the largest interschools music festivals in the country. Hundreds of students from many schools, both primary and secondary level, compete in individual and choral singing as well as individual instrumental and orchestral. In recent years the school built a dedicated Music and Arts Centre. Included in this centre is the purpose built G. B. Shaw Auditorium, named after one of Wesley's most famous past pupils.

Lifelines
In 1992, the college published its fourth, and final, instalment of the Lifelines anthology. The earlier instalments were published in 1985, 1988 and 1990 by The Underground Press Ltd, Wesley College. Under format of the anthologies, a panel of students within Wesley write to notable people, such as celebrities, sports people and world leaders, asking them to highlight their favourite poem with a brief explanation for their choosing. Thus far the anthology has raised over €140,000 for Irish charity Concern. The latest edition itself has raised €29,000 and was honoured as the Best Irish Published Book of the Year, in the 2007 Irish Book Awards. In 2010, The National Library of Ireland purchased the original letters that were included in the original 1985 edition of Lifelines. Subsequently, Wesley College donated all correspondence, photographs and other related archival material to the Library. The Discover Lifelines exhibition in the Library's main hall showed letters from this archive from writers, poets, actors, artists, media personalities and politician and ran throughout 2010. A collective edition of the anthology was published by Town House, Dublin, in 1992.

Senior Choir
The Senior Choir at Wesley College Dublin received a number of awards during the term 2011/2012, including the All Ireland School Choir Competition. This was broadcast on live RTÉ television. The choir also won both of their competitions in that year's Feis Ceol in Dublin. They have appeared on the Late Late Show on RTÉ as well as on RTÉ Radio One on Pat Kenny's morning show.

Wartime contribution

Wesley, like many other schools in Ireland, contributed to the effort of the two major world wars. Over 85 students of the college died in the First World War. Their names are listed on a memorial in the college concourse which reads "This building was erected to the honour of all old boys of this College who ventured their lives for defence of home and country in the Great War and especially in loving and grateful memory of those who fell". (The building mentioned was the old College Chapel, where the memorial was located before the move to Ballinteer.) 25 students of Wesley, including one German, died between 1939 and 1945 in the Second World War. These are also listed on a memorial in the main concourse. Remembrance Day is marked each year with the laying of a wreath on the memorial.

Notable past pupils

Politics and government
 Lionel Booth, TD
 Sir Edward Carson, barrister and MP, Leader of the Ulster Unionist Party 1910-21
 Henry Flavelle Forbes, C.I.E., President of the Court of Appeal, Iraq, 1920/21 
 Sir Robert Henry Woods MP, ENT Surgeon, President of the Royal College of Surgeons in Ireland 1910–11
 Sir Robert Hart, 1st Baronet, Inspector General of China's Imperial Maritime Custom Service (1863)
 Chaim Herzog, sixth President of Israel
 William McMillan, and Australian politician and businessman.
 H. B. Higgins, Attorney General of the Australian Government in 1904
 Sir Harold J. Maguire, Director-General of Intelligence at the British Ministry of Defence (1968–1972)
 Mervyn Taylor, TD, Minister for Equality and Law Reform
 Senator Gordon Wilson
 Neale Richmond TD, also served as Senator

Music and the arts
 Harry Furniss, caricaturist
 David Kitt and Robbie Kitt, members of the band Spilly Walker
 Annie Mac, BBC Radio 1 DJ
 Niall Morris, tenor, member of the Celtic Tenors
 Eva O'Connor, theatre actress who was nominated for Best Supporting Actress in the 2009 Irish Times Theatre Awards
 Stanley Townsend, television, film and stage actor (in the BBC's Rough Diamond and other dramas)
 Heather Jones, Professor of Modern and Contemporary European History, University College London
 Mark McCabe, music producer, remixer and Radio DJ for RTE 2FM. Best known for releasing Maniac 2000 that is the number two best selling record ever in Ireland

Science
 John Widdess, biologist, journal editor and medical historian
 Kenneth Wolfe, Professor of Genomic Evolution, UCD School of Medicine and UCD Conway Institute, University College Dublin

Business and philanthropy
 Philip Berber, former CEO of Cybercorp and multimillionaire philanthropist, Chairman of A Glimmer of Hope Foundation
 Richard Burrows, Chairman of British American Tobacco, former Governor of the Bank of Ireland
 Dermot FitzGerald, Irish businessman and philanthropist
 Frederick Keppel, Irish-American art dealer

Clergy
 Michael Burrows, Bishop of Cashel and Ossory
 Donald Caird, Archbishop of Dublin
 Richard Clarke, Archbishop of Armagh, Primate of Ireland
 Frank Johnston, head of the Royal Army Chaplains' Department, British Army

Nobel laureates
 George Bernard Shaw, playwright, Nobel Prize for Literature
 Ernest Walton, Nobel Prize for Physics.

Sporting alumni
Former Wesley College students have represented Ireland at international level in a number of sports.

Rugby union
 British and Irish Lions
 Eric Miller
 
 Herbert Aston
 Eric Miller
 Josh van der Flier

Rugby league
 
 Ross Barbour

Cricket
 men's internationals

 women's internationals
 Lara Molins
 Nikki Squire
 Nikki Symmons
 Julie van der Flier

Association football
 men's internationals
 Fred Horlacher 
 women's internationals
 Sylvia Gee

Field hockey
 men's internationals
 Michael Darling
 Kyle Good
 Kirk Shimmins

 women's internationals
 Nikki Symmons

Olympians
 Ireland
 Scott Evans; badminton – 2008 Beijing, 2012 London, 2016 Rio 
 Michael Darling; field hockey – 2016
 Kyle Good; field hockey – 2016
 Kirk Shimmins; field hockey – 2016
 Nick Sweeney; discus thrower – 1992, 1996, 2000, 2004 
 David Wilkins; sailing  – 1972, 1976, 1980, 1988, 1992

See also
Old Wesley

References

External links
 Wesley College - official website
 Wesley College Past Pupils Union - official website
 Old Wesley - Rugby Club Founded by past pupils

Educational institutions established in 1845
Secondary schools in Dún Laoghaire–Rathdown
Methodist schools
Methodist Church in Ireland
Private schools in the Republic of Ireland
Boarding schools in Ireland
Protestant schools in the Republic of Ireland
Protestant buildings and structures in the Republic of Ireland
1845 establishments in Ireland